JRD Tata Jubilee Park  is located in the heart of the Gumadera area in the Belpahar city of Jharsuguda district of Odisha, India. The park contains a wide collection of aromatic and beautiful flowers which add a sense of calmness and peace to the environment.

History

JRD Tata Jubilee Park or Tata Park, Belpahar was formerly named as Jubilee Park. It signifies the importance and memories of JRD Tata. On 3 March 2017, the Park was again renewed and inaugurated by Mr. Priyabrata Panda, managing director of TRL Krosaki Refractories Limited.

Main Attraction
Tata Park has led to great attraction during its open timings. People from far distances come here to spend times with their family and their friends. There are fitness centers, small gym equipment, child games. Its water fountain, fish pond and musical path attract a large number of visitors especially in the evening timing. In the morning, people come here for jogging as well as performing yoga and other exercises. The central statue of JRD Tata adds to the beauty of the park. Along with it lightning and nice surrounding are other advantages.

Features
It is a nice family park for photography as well as for spending some quality time. CCTV camera and the Security Guards perform their duty well due to which it is safe for all ages of people. Also there are places for sitting. Children accessible fun and games are too present. The pond contains fishes, turtles and ducks. The flow of water to the pond like a stream is also eye pleasant view. Also it is free entry and good vehicle parking facility.

Connectivity
The park is well connected by road transport, due to which it is easily accessible.

Images

References

Parks in India
Jharsuguda district